Daniel Chun-Tuen Tsang is an American activist and scholar whose writings have been of great importance in the Asian American and LGBT political movements.

Education 
Tsang graduated with a Bachelor of Arts in Government from the University of Redlands in 1971. He later received a Master of Arts in Political Science in 1973 and a Master of Library Sciences in 1977, both from the University of Michigan.

Career

Tsang worked with early activist organizations such as the Gay Liberation Front in Ann Arbor, Michigan, the Graduate Employees' Organization (GEO), and East Wind, an Asian American activist organization. Tsang also worked as a librarian for Temple University, Community College of Philadelphia, Free Library of Philadelphia and the University of California, Irvine.

In 1978 Tsang attended what he described as the founding meeting of the North American Man/Boy Love Association (NAMBLA), a pro-paedophilia advocacy organisation. He edited the 1981 volume The Age Taboo: Gay Male Sexuality, Power, and Consent, a publication that argued in favor of the legalization of sex between adults and children, child prostitution, and child pornography. As of 1989 he was a member of the Southern California chapter of NAMBLA.

Tsang's career has combined librarianship with activism. Key areas include organizing for queer rights among Asians, queer liberation, union rights, documenting social change, and archiving protest.
Tsang's scholarship has focused on data archiving and data management. He has also documented the way data sets can be identified for research. His assessment of sustainability for research library collections was the focus of a presentation at the Hong Kong University of Science and Technology.

During Tsang's career he has also identified resources that document protest movements such as the First March for Lesbian and Gay Rights, the U.S. Underground and Alternative Press of the 1960s and '70s and the Umbrella Movement.

Tsang has podcast at KUCI: Subversity 88.9 fm Irvine, CA.

Tsang's archival papers will be accessible at the Tamiment Library and Robert F. Wagner Archives at New York University.

References

External links
 Daniel Tsang papers: 1970–1978. Bentley Historical Library. University of Michigan.

1949 births
American librarians
Asian-American movement activists
Gay Liberation Front members
American gay writers
American LGBT people of Asian descent
Living people
Temple University faculty
University of California, Irvine faculty
American librarians of Asian descent
21st-century American LGBT people